Amphilius frieli is a species of fish in the family Amphiliidae, first found in the upper Congo Basin.

References

frieli
Freshwater fish of Central Africa
Fish described in 2015
Taxa named by Lawrence M. Page